"You've Got That Somethin'" is a song by Swedish recording artist Robyn from her debut album, Robyn Is Here. It was released as her debut single in 1995 in Sweden. The song was written by Robyn, Ulf Lindström, and Johan Ekhé, and it was produced by Lindström and Ekhé.

In her native Sweden, "You've Got That Somethin'" was a top thirty hit, peaking at number twenty-four. The single was a minor hit in the United Kingdom, peaking at number fifty-four. It also charted at number eighty-five in Germany.

Critical reception
A reviewer from People Magazine wrote, "Not only has Robyn mastered the English language (she writes all her own material), but she also challenges teen queens Brandy and Monica at their own hip-hop soul game. Just listen to the assured manner with which her voice glides over the swaggering, syncopated funk of “In My Heart” and “You’ve Got That Somethin’”."

Track listing

UK single

CD maxi-single
 "You've Got That Somethin'" (radio edit)
 "You've Got That Somethin'" (Scruffy Mix)
 "You've Got That Somethin'" (Marco's Hard Mix)
 "You've Got That Somethin'" (2000 Black Mix)
 "You've Got That Somethin'" (Golden Youngster Remix) (featuring Structure Rize)
 "You've Got That Somethin'" (Golden Youngster Straight Ta Ya Head Mix) (featuring Structure Rize)

German single

CD maxi-single
 "You've Got That Somethin'" (radio edit)
 "You've Got That Somethin'" (Marco's hard mix)
 "You've Got That Somethin'" (2000 Black mix)
 "I Wish" (a cappella)

Swedish single

12" single

Side A
 "You've Got That Somethin'" (Marco's Hard Mix)
Side B
 "You've Got That Somethin'" (Scruffy Mix)
 "You've Got That Somethin'" (2000 Black Mix)

Personnel
Lyrics – Robyn
Music and vocal arrangement – Robyn, Ulf Lindström, Johan Ekhé
Arrangement and production – Ulf Lindström, Johan Ekhé

Source:

Charts

References

1995 debut singles
1996 singles
Robyn songs
Songs written by Johan Ekhé
Songs written by Ulf Lindström
Song recordings produced by Ghost (production team)
Songs written by Robyn
Bertelsmann Music Group singles
1995 songs